Platycelyphium voense is a species of flowering plant in the family Fabaceae. It belongs to the subfamily Faboideae. It is the only member of the genus Platycelyphium.

References

Sophoreae
Monotypic Fabaceae genera